Daniel Island is one of the many uninhabited Canadian Arctic islands in the Qikiqtaaluk Region, Nunavut. It is a Baffin Island offshore island located in Frobisher Bay, southeast of Iqaluit. Other islands in the immediate vicinity include Eden Island, Fletcher Island, Nest Island, Redan Island and Scalene Island.

References 

Islands of Baffin Island
Islands of Frobisher Bay
Uninhabited islands of Qikiqtaaluk Region